Rowland Alston may refer to:

Sir Rowland Alston, 2nd Baronet (c. 1654–1697) of the Alston Baronets
Sir Rowland Alston, 4th Baronet (c. 1678–1769), MP for Bedfordshire 1722–1741
Sir Rowland Alston, 6th Baronet (died 1791), High Sheriff of Bedfordshire
Rowland Alston (1782–1865), MP for Hertfordshire 1835–41

See also
Alston (name)